The Portugal national cerebral palsy football team represents Portugal in international competition. The team has appeared at four Paralympic Games, with their best finish being a silver medal at the 1992 Summer Paralympics in Barcelona.  At the most recent IFCPF World Championships, the team finished 11, winning their placement match against Australia on penalty kicks.

Background 
Federaçao Portuguesa De Desporto Para Pessoas Com Deficiencia (FPDD) manages the national team. By 2016, Portugal had a national championships to support the national team and was active in participating in the IFCPF World Championships. National team development is supported by an International Federation of Cerebral Palsy Football (IFCPF) recognized national championship.  Recognized years for the national IFCPF recognized competition include  2010, 2011, 2012, 2013, 2014, and 2015.

Ranking 

Portugal was ranked eleventh in the world by the IFCPF in 2016. In November 2014, the team was ranked thirteenth. In August 2013, the team was ranked sixteenth. In September 2012, Portugal was ranked twenty-first. In July 2011, the team was ranked twenty-ninth.

Results 

Portugal has participated in a number of international tournaments. At the Football 7-a-side International Tournament in Portugal in 2011, Portugal lost to Canada 7 - 0. The team was scheduled to participate in the 2016 IFCPF Qualification Tournament World Championships in Vejen, Denmark in early August.  The tournament was part of the qualifying process for the 2017 IFCPF World Championships.  Other teams scheduled to participate included Scotland, Canada, Iran, Northern Ireland, Australia, Venezuela, Japan, Republic of South Korea, Germany, Denmark, and Spain.

IFCPF World Championships 
Portugal has participated in the IFCPF World Championships.

Paralympic Games 

Portugal has participated in 7-a-side football at the Paralympic Games, appearing at the 1984, 1992, 1996 and 2000 editions.  Their best finish was a silver medal in Barcelona in 1992.

Paralympic Results

References 

Cerebral Palsy
Portugal at the Paralympics
National cerebral palsy football teams
Football 7-a-side teams at the 1984 Summer Paralympics
Football 7-a-side teams at the 1992 Summer Paralympics
Football 7-a-side teams at the 1996 Summer Paralympics
Football 7-a-side teams at the 2000 Summer Paralympics